Stephanie Rose may refer to:
 Stephanie Marie Rose (born 1972), American jurist, United States District Court judge for the Southern District of Iowa
 Stephanie Rose (model), Australian model of Filipino descent
 Stephanie Rose (painter) (born 1943), American painter